This is a list of Brazilian football derbies, sorted by state. Only derbies between professional clubs are listed below.

Northeast Region

 Bahia (Salvador) x  Sport (Recife) - (The Northeast Battle)

Acre
Rio Branco (Rio Branco) vs. Juventus (Rio Branco) The Father & Son Derby 
Rio Branco (Rio Branco) vs. Independência (Rio Branco) The Grandpa Derby

Alagoas
CSA (Maceió) vs. CRB (Maceió)

Amapá
São José (Macapá) vs. Ypiranga (Macapá)

Amazonas
Manaus FC (Manaus) vs. Amazonas FC (Manaus) The Gavi-Onça Derby 
Nacional (Manaus) vs. Rio Negro (Manaus) The Rio-Nal
Nacional (Manaus) vs. São Raimundo (Manaus) The Blue Derby, The SãoNal
Rio Negro (Manaus) vs. São Raimundo (Manaus)
Nacional (Manaus) vs. Fast Clube (Itacoatiara) The Father & Son Derby
São Raimundo (Manaus) vs. Sul América (Manaus) The Black Rooster Derby
Penarol (Itacoatiara) vs. Nacional (Manaus) The Uruguayan Derby

Bahia
Bahia (Salvador) vs. Vitória (Salvador) The Ba-Vi
Itabuna (Itabuna) vs. Colo-Colo (Ilhéus) Cocoa Derby
 Bahia de Feira (Feira de Santana) x Fluminense de Feira (Feira de Santana) Princess Derby
 Juazeiro (Juazeiro) x Juazeirense (Juazeiro) Ju-Ju Derby
 Serrano (Vitória da Conquista) x Vitória da Conquista (Vitória da Conquista) Coffee Derby
 Atlético de Alagoinhas (Alagoinhas) x Catuense (Catu) Orange Derby
 Atlético de Alagoinhas (Alagoinhas) x Fluminense de Feira (Feira de Santana) Hinterland Derby
 Bahia (Salvador) x Botafogo de Salvador (Salvador) Bowl Derby
 Bahia (Salvador) x Galícia (Salvador) Colors Derby
 Bahia (Salvador) x Ypiranga (Salvador) People Derby
 Camaçari (Camaçari) x Camaçariense (Camaçari) Pole Derby
 Galícia (Salvador) x Ypiranga (Salvador) Gold Derby

Ceará
Fortaleza (Fortaleza) vs. Ceará (Fortaleza) The King Derby (Clássico-Rei)
Fortaleza (Fortaleza) vs. Ferroviário (Fortaleza) The Colors Derby
Ceará (Fortaleza) vs. Ferroviário (Fortaleza) The Peace Derby

Distrito Federal
Gama (Gama) vs. Brasiliense (Taguatinga) Green and Yellow Derby
 Brasília (Brasília) vs. Gama (Gama) The Brasília Derby

Espírito Santo
Rio Branco (Vitória) vs. Desportiva Ferroviária (Cariacica) The Capixaba Derby

Goiás
Goiás (Goiânia) vs. Vila Nova (Goiânia)
Atlético Goianiense (Goiânia) vs. Goiânia (Goiânia)
Anapolina (Anápolis) vs. Anápolis (Anápolis) 
Goiás (Goiânia) x Atlético Goianiense (Goiânia)

Maranhão
Sampaio Corrêa (São Luís) vs. Moto Club (São Luís) The Samoto Derby 
Sampaio Corrêa (São Luís) vs. Maranhão (São Luís) The Samará Derby 
Maranhão (São Luís) vs. Moto Club (São Luís) Maremoto

Mato Grosso
Mixto (Cuiabá) vs. CEOV (Várzea Grande) The Millions Derby

Mixto (Cuiabá) vs. Dom Bosco (Cuiabá) The Grandpa Derby 
Luverdense (Lucas do Rio Verde) vs. Sorriso (Sorriso) The Soybean Derby

Mato Grosso do Sul
Operário (Campo Grande) vs. Comercial (Campo Grande) The Comerário 
CENE (Campo Grande) vs. Comercial (Campo Grande)
CENE (Campo Grande) vs. Operário (Campo Grande)

Minas Gerais
Atlético Mineiro (Belo Horizonte) vs. Cruzeiro (Belo Horizonte) Clássico Mineiro
Atlético Mineiro (Belo Horizonte) vs. América (Belo Horizonte) The Classic of Multitudes
Cruzeiro (Belo Horizonte) vs. América (Belo Horizonte) Derby Mineiro 
Uberlândia (Uberlândia) vs. Uberaba (Uberaba) Mineiro Triangle Derby

Pará
Paysandu (Belém) vs. Remo (Belém) The Re-Pa
Paysandu (Belém) vs. Tuna Luso (Belém)
Remo (Belém) vs. Tuna Luso (Belém)

Paraíba
Campinense (Campina Grande) vs. Treze (Campina Grande) The Major Derby
Botafogo (João Pessoa) vs. Auto Esporte (João Pessoa) The Botauto

Paraná
Atlético Paranaense (Curitiba) vs. Coritiba (Curitiba) The Atletiba
Coritiba (Curitiba) vs. Paraná Clube (Curitiba) The Paratiba
Atlético Paranaense (Curitiba) vs. Paraná Clube (Curitiba) The Parático
Cascavel (Cascavel) vs. Toledo (Toledo) The Soybean Classic
Londrina (Londrina) vs. Grêmio Maringá (Maringá) The Coffee bean Classic

Pernambuco
Sport (Recife) vs. Santa Cruz (Recife) The Classic of Multitudes (Clássico das Multidões) 
Sport (Recife) vs. Náutico (Recife) The Classic of Classics (Clássico dos Clássicos) 
Sport (Recife) vs. América (Recife) The Classic of Champions (Clássico dos Campeões) 
Santa Cruz (Recife) vs. Náutico (Recife) The Classic of Emotions (Clássico das Emoções) 
Santa Cruz (Recife) vs. América (Recife) The Friendship Classic (Clássico da Amizade)
Náutico (Recife) vs. América (Recife) The Classic of Technique and Discipline (Clássico da Técnica e da Disciplina) 
Central (Caruaru) vs. Porto (Caruaru) The 'Matuto' Classic (Clássico Matuto) 
Vitória (Vitória de Santo Antão) vs. Vera Cruz (Vitória de Santo Antão) The Vi-Ver Classic (Clássico Vi-Ver) 
Petrolina (Petrolina) vs. 1º de Maio (Petrolina) The Petrolina Classic (Clássico de Petrolina) 
Cabense (Cabo de Santo Agostinho) vs. Ferroviário do Cabo (Cabo de Santo Agostinho) The Ca-Fe Classic (Clássico Ca-Fe)

Piauí
River (Teresina) vs. Flamengo (Teresina) The Rivengo

Rio de Janeiro
Flamengo (Rio de Janeiro) vs. Fluminense (Rio de Janeiro) The Fla-Flu("Fla-Flu")
Flamengo (Rio de Janeiro) vs. Vasco (Rio de Janeiro) The Classic of Millions("O Clássico dos Milhões")
Botafogo (Rio de Janeiro) vs. Flamengo (Rio de Janeiro) The Rivalry Derby("Clássico da Rivalidade")
Botafogo (Rio de Janeiro) vs. Fluminense (Rio de Janeiro) The Grandpa Derby ("Clássico Vovô") (so-called because it is the oldest derby played in Brazil)
Vasco (Rio de Janeiro) vs. Botafogo (Rio de Janeiro) The Black-and-white Derby("Clássico Alvinegro")
Vasco (Rio de Janeiro) vs. Fluminense (Rio de Janeiro) The Giants Derby("Clássico dos Gigantes") 
América (Rio de Janeiro) vs. Vasco (Rio de Janeiro) The Peace Derby("Clássico da Paz")
Americano (Campos dos Goytacazes) vs. Goytacaz (Campos dos Goytacazes) Goyta-Cano("Clássico Goyta-Cano"), Campos Bay Classic("Clássico da Baía de Campos")

Rio Grande do Norte
ABC (Natal) vs. América (Natal) The King Derby

Rio Grande do Sul
Grêmio (Porto Alegre) vs. Internacional (Porto Alegre) The Grenal
Caxias (Caxias do Sul) vs. Juventude (Caxias do Sul) The Ca-Ju
Juventude (Caxias do Sul) vs. Internacional (Porto Alegre) The Juvenal
Rio Grande (Rio Grande) vs. São Paulo (Rio Grande) The Rio-Rita
Bagé (Bagé) vs. Guarany (Bagé) The Ba-Gua
Brasil (Pelotas) vs. Pelotas (Pelotas) The Bra-Pel
Brasil (Pelotas) vs. Farroupilha (Pelotas) The Bra-Far
Farroupilha (Pelotas) vs. Pelotas (Pelotas) The Far-Pel
Avenida (Santa Cruz do Sul) vs. Santa Cruz (Santa Cruz do Sul) The Ave-Cruz
Riograndense (Santa Maria) vs. Internacional (Santa Maria) The Rional

Rondônia
Ji-Paraná (Ji-Paraná) vs. União Cacoalense (Cacoal) Neighborhood Derby

Roraima
Atlético Roraima (Boa Vista) vs. Baré (Boa Vista) The Bareima

Santa Catarina
Figueirense (Florianópolis) vs. Avaí (Florianópolis) Florianópolis Derby 
Figueirense (Florianópolis) vs. Criciúma (Criciúma)
Figueirense (Florianópolis) vs. Joinville (Joinville)
Criciúma (Criciúma) vs. Avaí (Florianópolis)
Criciúma (Criciúma) vs. Joinville (Joinville)
Avaí (Florianópolis) vs. Joinville (Joinville)

São Paulo
 Corinthians (São Paulo) vs. Palmeiras (São Paulo) The Derby Paulista
Corinthians (São Paulo) vs. São Paulo (São Paulo) The Majestic (Majestoso)
 Palmeiras (São Paulo) vs.  São Paulo (São Paulo) The King Strike (Choque-Rei)
Corinthians (São Paulo) vs. Santos (Santos) The Black and White Duel
Santos (Santos) vs. São Paulo (São Paulo) The San-São
Santos (Santos) vs. Palmeiras (São Paulo) Clássico da Saudade (The Good Times Classic) 
Guarani (Campinas) vs. Ponte Preta (Campinas) The Dérbi Campineiro
São Caetano vs. Santo André (Santo André) The ABC Classic
Comercial (Ribeirão Preto) vs. Botafogo (Ribeirão Preto) The Come-Fogo
São José (São José dos Campos) vs. Taubaté (Taubaté) Paraíba Valley Derby
Mogi Mirim (Mogi Mirim) vs. Guaçuano (Mogi Guaçu)
Mogi Mirim (Mogi Mirim) vs. Itapirense (Itapira)

Sergipe
Sergipe (Aracaju) vs. Confiança (Aracaju)

Tocantins
Palmas (Palmas) vs. Tocantinópolis (Tocantinópolis)

Interstate Rivalries
Atlético Mineiro (Minas Gerais, Belo Horizonte) vs. Flamengo (Rio de Janeiro, Rio de Janeiro) Galo vs Mengão
Corinthians (São Paulo, São Paulo) vs. Flamengo (Rio de Janeiro, Rio de Janeiro) Meeting of Nations (Encontro das Nações)

References

External links
 Clássicos do Futebol Brasileiro

 *